Translocated promoter region is a component of the tpr-met fusion protein.

External links